Viktor Petermann (26 May 1916 – 19 May 2001) was a German Luftwaffe ace and recipient of the Knight's Cross of the Iron Cross during World War II.  The Knight's Cross of the Iron Cross was awarded to recognise extreme battlefield bravery or successful military leadership.  Viktor Petermann was captured by American troops in May 1945, he was handed over to Soviet troops and was released in August 1945 due to his health problems. At the end of the war he flew the Me 262 fighter jet. During his career was credited with 64 aerial victories, four of them, after he lost his arm in an airfight, all on the Eastern Front.

Awards
 Flugzeugführerabzeichen
 Front Flying Clasp of the Luftwaffe
 Ehrenpokal der Luftwaffe (9 September 1943)
 Iron Cross (1939)
 2nd Class (31 August 1942)
 1st Class (16 October 1942)
 Wound Badge (1939)
 in Black (12 June 1943)
 in Silver (22 December 1943)
 German Cross in Gold on 23 July 1943 as Feldwebel in the 5./Jagdgeschwader 52
 Knight's Cross of the Iron Cross on 29 February 1944 as Leutnant and pilot in the III./Jagdgeschwader 52

References

Citations

Bibliography

External links
Luftwaffe 1939–1945 History
Ritterkreuztraeger 1939-1945
Aces of the Luftwaffe

1916 births
2001 deaths
Luftwaffe pilots
German World War II flying aces
Recipients of the Gold German Cross
Recipients of the Knight's Cross of the Iron Cross
People from Vejprty
German prisoners of war in World War II held by the Soviet Union
Sudeten German people